Mac Hollowell (born September 26, 1998) is a Canadian professional ice hockey defenceman. He is currently playing for the Toronto Marlies in the American Hockey League (AHL) while under contract to the Toronto Maple Leafs of the National Hockey League (NHL). In 2019, he was named to the Ontario Hockey League First All Star Team.

Playing career

Early career
Hollowell played 38 games with the Niagara Rivermen Minor Midget hockey club, where he tallied 8 goals and 19 assists for 27 points. He then played one season of junior B hockey with the Niagara Falls Canucks under the leadership of Frank Pietrangelo. He was eventually drafted by the Sault Ste. Marie Greyhounds in the 12th round of the 2014 Ontario Hockey League (OHL) Priority Selection Draft. Hollowell recorded his first career OHL goal on December 28, 2014, against the Saginaw Spirit. He ended his rookie season totalling two goals and four assists in 11 games.

Although eligible for the 2017 NHL Entry Draft, Hollowell went undrafted. However, he drew some interest from the Toronto Maple Leafs who invited him to their prospect camp during the summer. He returned to the Greyhounds where he ended the 2017–18 season fifth amongst leading scoring OHL defencemen with 12 goals and 44 assists in 63 games. Due to his play, Hollowell was drafted in the fourth round of the 2018 NHL Entry Draft by the Toronto Maple Leafs. He was invited to attend the Toronto Marlies training camp but was returned to the Greyhounds prior to the 2018–19 season. Prior to the start of his season as an overager, Hollowell was named an alternate captain alongside Jordan Sambrook and Morgan Frost. Hollowell finished his final season in the OHL with 24 goals, 53 assists, and 77 points in 64 games. As a result, he was selected for the OHL First All-Star Team.

Professional
On March 7, 2019, the Maple Leafs signed Hollowell to an entry level contract. At the conclusion of his OHL career, Hollowell joined the Toronto Marlies of the American Hockey League (AHL) during their Calder Cup run. Upon making the jump to professional hockey, Hollowell remarked "The guys are bigger and older and positionally smarter, so I'm just trying to find ways to play my game. It's definitely been a big adjustment, but I like it." After attending the Toronto Maple Leafs training camp, Hollowell was reassigned to the Marlies for the 2019–20 season. However, he began the season with the Leafs East Coast Hockey League (ECHL) affiliate, the Newfoundland Growlers.  

On October 6, 2019, Hollowell recorded his first career ECHL goal in an overtime win against the Reading Royals. He made his AHL regular season debut in an 8–5 win over the Texas Stars on November 16, 2019. However, on November 24 he was reassigned to the ECHL.

On October 28, 2020, with the upcoming 2020–21 season delayed by the ongoing pandemic, Hollowell was loaned to Finnish second division club, TUTO Hockey of the Mestis. He registered 6 points through 6 games before returning to North America for the Maple Leafs training camp. On November 23, 2022, Hollowell made his NHL debut against the New Jersey Devils.

Personal life
Hollowell was born to parents Jenn Sheldon and Lenn Hollowell.

Career statistics

Awards and honours

References

External links 

1998 births
Living people
Canadian ice hockey defencemen
Ice hockey people from Ontario
Newfoundland Growlers players
Sault Ste. Marie Greyhounds players
Sportspeople from Niagara Falls, Ontario
Toronto Maple Leafs draft picks
Toronto Maple Leafs players
Toronto Marlies players
TuTo players